In early periods of North American industrial development, an ark was a temporary boat used for river transport in eastern North America before slack-water canals (a lock system and appropriate dams allowing two way travel) and railroads made them obsolete. Because they could be built using relatively crude hand tools, Arks were built in American colonial and early republic times, primarily to carry cargo downriver on the spring freshets, and especially to carry milled lumber, charcoal and other forest products and bulk agricultural produce to a city or a port downriver; while logs were often tied into rafts, on long trips which could take weeks, the rafts would be accompanied by such arks as crew support quarters. Deep rivers allowed large log arks such as is described below instead of less controllable rafts. Since by 1800, most eastern towns and cities were short on heating fuels,<ref
 name=JEHeld></ref> even badly processed timber or planks could readily be sold at the destinations.<ref
 name=DEL&LHcanals>
 </ref>

But it was in the role of delivering coal as a fuel to alleviate the long-standing first energy crisis in the eastern United States that the Arks saw their most frequent transport uses because of the 1816 invention of  Josiah White's Bear Trap Lock system. The mechanisms allowed controllable artificially created freshets<ref
 name=HoCCPA>

For a full decade ever increasing numbers were built and sent  to the docks at Philadelphia.

By the time the long delayed opening of the Delaware Canal reached partial operation in 1831 and it could switch to another form of river boat, the Lehigh Coal & Navigation Company was annually deforesting vast timber stands reaching by then more than  upriver through the steep banked waters of the Lehigh River Gorge to ship enough coal to meet demand in Philadelphia. Pennsylvania State Historian Fred Brenckman in The History of Carbon County notes that the production of Ark river craft in 1831 by the LC&N would total over  connected end to end.
Upon arrival, the cargo was sold, the ark was dismantled and its lumber was also sold, and the ark pilots returned home on foot or horseback.
Despite the slowness of the craft, it was stable and with a skilled crew was capable of maneuvering through fairly narrow points.  Other river craft, usually the batteau or bateau worked alongside the arks, ferrying the workers while the horses and bunks and supplies floated down the larger, stable structures.

The arks within the Greenbrier River in West Virginia averaged sixty feet save for the larger cooking arks used to feed loggers four times a day.
The river ark was once a common sight along the Greenbrier River in West Virginia with the spring floods bringing miles of white pine logs from Pocahontas County to Greenbrier County.  Photographs of these massive vessels were posted along the Greenbrier River Trail at the town of Caldwell, West Virginia.  These photographs illustrate integral scenes in W. E. Blackhurst's book, Riders of the Flood.  The author based the plot along the world of the river logging era at the turn of the century within the area of the yet-to-be-created Monongahela National Forest.  He had a meticulous interest in historical detail.  In it he gives one of the clearest written descriptions of the river ark:

"The ark was built on a solid platform of logs.  The heavy logs laid side by side formed a raft sixty feet long and twenty-four feet wide.  Running crosswise at each four-foot interval, lash poles (lashing of hickory or locust) were placed.  These were about six inch in diameter.  At the point where the lash pole crossed each foundation log, a strong, U-shaped bow of bent white oak pinned it firmly to the log.  The bows had been worked from straight lengths of oak one and a half inches square and bent to the U-shape.  Both open ends were left square, and the body of the bow was shaved down and rounded.  On each side of the lash pole, square holes had been cut deep into the foundation logs.  Into these holes the squared ends were driven, thus bringing the bow down tight against the lash pole.  A strong wedge of ash wood held each squared end tightly in place.

"Lengthwise to the long platform, and resting across the lash poles, ran six-by-six sawed timbers.  These formed the foundation for the low building that was erected on the raft.  They were also the support for its plank floor.  The building was a plain rectangular hut of sawed lumber nailed lengthwise to upright studding.  The roof was not wedged, but rounding, an effect gained by the simple expedient of bending roof boards across in a distinct bow.

"The building did not cover the entire raft floor.  At each end, a six-foot length of space was left open, and along each side the walls were set in a scant two feet, leaving a narrow pathway alongside the building.  On each of the four corners of the raft stood a sturdy post of peeled wood.  These were the snubbing posts, and were thus placed so that the ark might be tied up from any corner.  Seeing Duncan look closely at the posts, Warwick explained, "That's apple wood—the only wood we can find that won't grow rough from the chafing of a rope."

"Duncan's interest was keenly aroused by the steering arrangement.  On each end of the log platform was placed a short length of log, which was securely fastened to the logs beneath.  Projecting upright on this base was a smooth, strong wooden pin.  The top of the pin thrust up into the handle of the long steering sweep, thus forming a pivot point.  The sweep could be swung from side to side, but always it rested securely on the smooth, upright pin.

The sweep itself was a long, tapered pole of about twenty-foot length.  Six feet of the length at the small end projected across the pivoting pin onto the deck.  The larger end lay out over the water.  To the water end had been attached a broad wooden blade nearly ten feet long.  To swing the heavy sweep and guide the cumbersome ark required the strength of two men at each of the sweep handles.

The little building was divided roughly into three parts.  At each end were two stalls for horses.  The center space was for the carrying of horse feed, harness, and tools, and for the sleeping quarters of the teamsters.

Every September the town of Ronceverte, West Virginia hosts the play Riders of the Flood, based on the book of the same name.  In it, a scaled-down mock-up version of a river ark is part of the set and is a backdrop for the historical accuracy of the project.

The village of Arkport, New York derives its name from this type of transport.

Notes

References
Notes

Bibliography
A History of the Susquehanna River Arks
Riders of the Flood
W. E. Blackhurst
Greenbrier River Trail
Patchwork Films (Pocahontas County, West Virginia)

Riverboats
Rafts
History of Pennsylvania
History of New York (state)
History of West Virginia
Pocahontas County, West Virginia
Greenbrier County, West Virginia
Monongahela National Forest
Logging in the United States
Logging railroads in the United States
19th century in the United States

tr:Kano